Rivière-Vaseuse is an unorganized territory in the Bas-Saint-Laurent region of Quebec, Canada.

It is named after the Vaseuse River, a tributary of the Matapédia River via the Milnikek River. This territory is uninhabited.

Demographics
Population trend:
 Population in 2021: 0
 Population in 2016: 0
 Population in 2011: 5
 Population in 2006: 0
 Population in 2001: 0
 Population in 1996: 0
 Population in 1991: 0

See also
 List of unorganized territories in Quebec

References

Unorganized territories in Bas-Saint-Laurent
La Matapédia Regional County Municipality